The  was one of the five routes of the Edo period. It was built to connect Edo (modern-day Tokyo) with Mutsu Province and the present-day city of Shirakawa, Fukushima Prefecture, Japan. It was established by Tokugawa Ieyasu for government officials traveling through the area.

Subroutes

In addition to the established use of traveling from Edo to Mutsu Province, there were also many roads that connected from the Ōshū Kaidō. One such sub-route was the Sendaidō (仙台道), which connected Mutsu Province with Sendai. The terminus for the Sendaidō is in Aoba-ku in modern Sendai. From there, the Matsumaedō (松前道) connected Sendai with Hakodate, Hokkaidō. Though the Ōshū Kaidō has only 27 post stations, there were over 100 designated post stations when the subroutes are included.

Travel
In the early Edo period, travel along the road mostly consisted of magistrates heading towards Edo in order to take part in sankin kōtai. After Hakodate's development, the late Edo period saw travel further increase as a result of increasing trade with Russia.

Nowadays, the path of the Ōshū Kaidō and its extensions is followed by National Route 4 from Tokyo to Aomori via Sendai and National Route 280 from Aomori to Minamya.

Stations of the Ōshū Kaidō
The 27 stations of the Ōshū Kaidō are listed below in order and are divided by their modern-day prefecture. The first seventeen stations are shared with the Nikkō Kaidō. The present day municipality is listed afterwards in parentheses.

Tokyo

Starting Location: Nihonbashi (日本橋) (Chūō-ku)
1. Senju-shuku (千住宿) (Adachi-ku)

Saitama Prefecture
2. Sōka-shuku (草加宿) (Sōka)
3. Koshigaya-shuku (越ヶ谷宿) (Koshigaya)
4. Kasukabe-shuku (粕壁宿) (Kasukabe)
5. Sugito-shuku (杉戸宿) (Sugito, Kitakatsushika District)
6. Satte-shuku (幸手宿) (Satte)
7. Kurihashi-shuku (栗橋宿) (Kuki)

Ibaraki Prefecture
8. Nakada-shuku (中田宿) (Koga)
9. Koga-shuku (古河宿) (Koga)

Tochigi Prefecture
10. Nogi-shuku (野木宿) (Nogi, Shimotsuga District)
11. Mamada-shuku (間々田宿) (Oyama)
12. Oyama-shuku (小山宿) (Oyama)
13. Shinden-shuku (新田宿) (Oyama)
14. Koganei-shuku (小金井宿) (Shimotsuke)
15. Ishibashi-shuku (石橋宿) (Shimotsuke)
16. Suzumenomiya-shuku (雀宮宿) (Utsunomiya)
17. Utsunomiya-shuku (宇都宮宿) (Utsunomiya)
18. Shirosawa-shuku (白澤宿) (Utsunomiya)
19. Ujiie-shuku (氏家宿) (Sakura)
20. Kitsuregawa-shuku (喜連川宿) (Sakura)
21. Sakuyama-shuku (佐久山宿) (Ōtawara)
Yagisawa-shuku (八木沢宿) (Ōtawara) (ai no shuku)
22. Ōtawara-shuku (大田原宿) (Ōtawara)
23. Nabekake-shuku (鍋掛宿) (Nasushiobara)
24. Koebori-shuku (越堀宿) (Nasushiobara)
Terago-shuku (寺子宿) (Nasushiobara) (ai no shuku)
25. Ashino-shuku (芦野宿) (Nasu, Nasu District)
Tani-shuku (谷宿) (Nasu, Nasu District) (ai no shuku)
Yorii-shuku (寄居宿) (Nasu, Nasu District) (ai no shuku)

Fukushima Prefecture
26. Shirosaka-shuku (白坂宿) (Shirakawa)
27. Shirakawa-shuku (白河宿) (Shirakawa)
Ending Location: Shirakawa Castle (白河城) (Shirakawa)

See also
Edo Five Routes
Tōkaidō (or 53 Stations of the Tōkaidō)
Nakasendō (or 69 Stations of the Nakasendō)
Kōshū Kaidō
Nikkō Kaidō
Other routes
Hokkoku Kaidō
Kisoji
Mikuni Kaidō
Tanabu Kaidō

References

External links
Ōshū Kaidō Travel Journal 

Road transport in Japan
17th-century establishments in Japan